Léopold de Saussure (30 May 1866 – 30 July 1925) was a Swiss-born French sinologist, pioneering scholar of ancient Chinese astronomy, and officer in the French navy. After a naval career which took him to Indochina, China, and Japan, he left the service and devoted the rest of his life to scholarship. He was most famous for his studies of ancient Chinese astronomy.

He was the younger brother of Ferdinand de Saussure, the pioneering linguist and semiotician, and René de Saussure, a Swiss Esperantist and mathematician.

Career
Léopold de Saussure was born in Switzerland, just outside Geneva, in the hamlet, Creux de Genthod. His family were Protestants with roots in Lorraine, France who had come to Geneva after the revocation of the Edict of Nantes in 1588. His father, Henri Louis Frédéric de Saussure, was a mineralogist, entomologist, and taxonomist and a constant traveler and explorer who wrote treatises on the insects of Africa and had an encyclopedic range of interests. 

From his early teens de Saussure set out to make a career in the navy, an undertaking which one historian called "a somewhat problematic undertaking in Switzerland." Saussure, with his father's permission, became a French citizen in order to enter the École Navale, and in 1885 went to sea as a cadet. In 1887, he successfully demanded admission to the Ecole des Langues orientales vivantes in Paris.

He spent the years 1889–1891 in Indochina, then a French colony, as well as in Japan, but mainly in China, where he served on the gunboat Aspie, which cruised the Yangtze River. de Saussure gathered not only linguistic experience, particularly in Vietnamese, but a stock of anecdotes and ideas on Asian history and writings, most of which he later abandoned, however. He took part in the French campaign in Dahomey before family concerns obliged him to resign his commission. 
 
On his return to France, he applied his energies entirely to research. After publishing an article on Korea, he published his first major work, Psychologie De La Colonisation Française (1899). The volume offered an analysis of the assimilation of the French language among colonialized peoples. He echoed some of the linguistic concepts of his brother, Ferdinand, but subscribed, as Ferdinand did not, to the concept of a "psychological race" modeled on the concept "historical race" offered by Gustave le Bon.  de Saussure argued that both the French and Spanish empires would dissolve because they did not recognize the unbridgeable divisions between the superior and lower races, while his linguist brother did not view racial differences as absolute or predetermined.

[[File:La-sphère-céleste-chinoise (Saussure).jpg|thumb|left|250px|The heavenly spheres from Les Origines De L'astronomie Chinoise]]In the years from 1899 to 1922, de Saussure published dozens of articles, especially in the Paris journal T'oung Pao, the leading outlet for sinology in Europe. The subjects included ancient Chinese astronomy, calendars, zodiac, as well as the influence of ancient middle-eastern cultures on China. He argued, however, that Chinese astronomy influenced Babylonian astronomy in the face of those who assumed that China must have been influenced from the outside. A group of these articles were reprinted after his death. 

de Saussure died 30 July 1925 in Geneva, after a mysterious illness confined him to bed for almost ten years.

Scholarly contributions
de Saussure, since he had practical experience as a sailor, was able to use his knowledge as a practical navigator to show that even James Legge and other well-known sinologists had not correctly understood the astronomical references in such works as the Shujing. Joseph Needham, the historian of Chinese science, calls Saussure's long series of papers "still indispensable" and says that he possessed "considerable sinological knowledge," though not as much as some.

Representative works
  Internet Archive.
 
  Download copy; Pdf (automatic download).

 
 
 
  Reprints 10 articles which appeared in T'oung Pao'' (1909-1922) on ancient Chinese astronomy, calendars, zodiac, etc.

References and further reading

Notes

External links 
 Note sur Léopold de Saussure, pionnier de l'histoire de l'astrologie chinoise par Patrice Guinard

French sinologists
1866 births
1925 deaths
Writers from Geneva
Swiss emigrants to France
INALCO alumni
French Navy officers
Astronomy in China